Magdalis convexicollis is a species of wedge-shaped bark weevil in the beetle family Curculionidae. It is found in North America.

References

Further reading

 
 

Curculionidae
Articles created by Qbugbot
Beetles described in 1913